Jean Dieu de Saint-Jean was a French painter (1654–1695), son of Jean Dieu (1625 – c. 1638).

Works 
 Musée du château de Blois, Portrait du musicien Marin Marais, signed I DE S IE, referring to his initials "J. de S. Je(an)."

Bibliography 
 Jonathan Dunford and Pierre-Gilles Girault. Un portrait du musicien Marin Marais par Jean Dieu de Saint-Jean au musée du château de Blois ("a portrait of the musician Marin Marais by Jean Dieu de Saint-Jean in the musée du château de Blois"). Les cahiers du château et des musées de Blois, no.37, Dec 2006 – June 2007, pp. 15–21.

1654 births
1695 deaths
17th-century French painters
French male painters